The Big Split is a 1999 romantic comedy independent film written, directed and produced by Martin Hynes, and starring Hynes and Judy Greer. The film won a Golden Trailer award in 2001 in the category "Best Trailer - No Budget".

References

External links
 

1999 films
1999 romantic comedy films
American romantic comedy films
1990s English-language films
1990s American films